Saare Jahaan Se Mehnga is a 2013 Bollywood satire film directed by Anshul Sharma starring Sanjay Mishra and Pragati Pandey. Written by Rupesh Thapliyal and Vijay Manral, Lyrics by Naveen Tyagi the film also has Ranjan Chhabra, Disha, Vishwa Mohan Badola, Pramod Pathak, Zakir Hussain and Sitaram Panchal. Saare Jahaan Se Mehnga..., produced by Ashok Pandey under the banner of Revel Films, is a satire on the rising prices in the country.

The movie was a box office disaster.

Cast
 Sanjay Mishra as Puttan Pal
 Pragati Pandey as Noori
 Zakir Hussain as Loan Inspector
 Vishwa Mohan Badola as Nag Pal
 Ranjan Chhabra as Gopal
 Pramod Pathak as Mani Pal
 Disha Pandey as Suman
 Sitaram Panchal as Vedpal
 Rajpal as Rashan Pal

Soundtrack

The soundtrack of Saare Jahaan Se Mehnga consists of 6 songs composed by Manish J. Tipu the lyrics of which were written by Naveen Tyagi.

Critical reception

The Times of India gave the film a rating of 2 out of 5 saying that, "Saare Jahaan Se Mehenga has a brilliant concept, earnest performances and clean humour. The film however falls short of evolving beyond the basic idea, which curtails the impact it should ideally make." Vinayak Chakravorty of India Today gave the film a rating of 2 out of 5 saying that, "At the core of debutant director Anshul Sharma's film is a whacky idea. The idea, though, gets lost in interpretation. The film is an honest intention gone astray." Sudhish Kamath of The Hindu reviewed the film saying that Saare Jahaan Se Mehnga is "A sincere film straight from the heart that takes too long to get going." Ananya Bhattacharya of Zee News gave the film a rating of 1.5 out of 5 saying that, "In all, ‘Saare Jahaan Se Mehnga’ leaves you with the question, ‘Why?’... Why, for example, did the makers decide to make such a film when we are so troubled by inflation already?" Nandini Ramnath of Live Mint reviewed the film saying that, "The simplistic and limited premise is better suited to an hour-long television series episode than a full-length feature. Saare Jahaan Se Mehnga feels stretched even at a relatively short running length of an hour and 48 minutes."

Taran Adarsh of Bollywood Hungama gave the film a rating of 2.5 out of 5 and said that, "On the whole, SAARE JAHAAN SE MEHNGA… is topical, relevant and relatable, with some endearing moments. It may be lacking in face-value, but you can’t deny that it’s an honest effort!" Shubhra Gupta of The Indian Express gave the film a rating of 2.5 out of 5 saying that, "The film has been written zippily by people who know this world. It looks and feels authentic, minus exaggeration. And the actors look as if they belong." Rajeev Masand of News18 gave the film a rating of 2.5 out of 5 and said that the film "is a well-intentioned satire constructed around a promising premise. But the film’s writers fail to build on their clever central idea, and ultimately deliver an undercooked script that lacks the consistent wit of 2010’s Phas Gaye Re Obama."

Box office
Saare Jahaan Se Mehnanga collected 84 lakhs. Made on a budget of 5 crore it could not cover its budget. It was considered as a disaster by Box Office India.

References

External links
 
 

2013 films
2010s Hindi-language films
Indian satirical films
2013 directorial debut films